Francisco Pineda may refer to:
 Francisco Pineda (footballer, born 1959), Spanish football forward
 Fran Pineda (born 1988), Spanish football forward
 Francisco Pineda (environmentalist), Salvadoran environmentalist